"Give Me the Simple Life" is a 1945 song written by Rube Bloom (music) and Harry Ruby (lyrics). It was introduced in the 1946 film Wake Up and Dream.

Chart recordings
 Bing Crosby - Decca single, recorded August 29, 1945 with Jimmy Dorsey and His Orchestra. This charted briefly in 1946.
 Benny Goodman & his Orchestra with vocal by Liza Morrow, (Columbia single, 1945). This also charted briefly in 1946.

Film appearances
1946 The Dark Corner - played on the radio in the background. This film had a May, 1946 release date which preceded the December, 1946 release date of Wake Up And Dream.
1946 Wake Up and Dream - sung by John Payne and June Haver.
1978 A Wedding - played on piano and sung by Tony Llorens.
1995 Father of the Bride Part II - sung by Steve Tyrell
1998 Skinnamarink TV - sung by Sharon, Lois & Bram
1953 Dangerous Crossing - Dance scene on ship with Jeanne Crain

References

1945 songs
Songs with music by Rube Bloom
Songs with lyrics by Harry Ruby
Songs with music by Harry Ruby